Schipanski is a surname. Notable people with the surname include:

 Dagmar Schipanski (1943–2022), German physicist, academic, and politician
 Tankred Schipanski (born 1976), German politician

Surnames of Slavic origin